Lieutenant-General Sir John Moore,  (13 November 1761 – 16 January 1809), also known as Moore of Corunna, was a senior British Army officer.  He is best known for his military training reforms and for his death at the Battle of Corunna, in which he repulsed a French army under Marshal Soult during the Peninsular War.

After the war General Sarrazin wrote a French history of the battle, which nonetheless may have been written in light of subsequent events, stating that "Whatever Bonaparte may assert, Soult was most certainly repulsed at Corunna; and the British gained a defensive victory, though dearly purchased with the loss of their brave general Moore, who was alike distinguished for his private virtues, and his military talents."

Early years
John Moore was born in Glasgow, the son of John Moore, a doctor and writer, and the older brother of Admiral Sir Graham Moore.  He attended Glasgow High School, but at the age of 11 joined his father and Douglas, the young 16-year-old 8th Duke of Hamilton (1756–1799), his father's pupil, on a grand tour of France, Italy and Germany.  This included a two-year stay in Geneva, where Moore's education continued.

Military and political career 1776–1798 

He joined the British Army in 1776 as an ensign in the 51st Regiment of Foot then based in Menorca. He first saw action in 1778 during the American War of Independence as a lieutenant in the 82nd Regiment of Foot, which was raised in Lanarkshire for service in North America by the 8th Duke of Hamilton. From 1779 to 1781 he was garrisoned at Halifax, Nova Scotia. In 1779, he distinguished himself in action during the Penobscot Expedition in present-day Maine, when a small British detachment held off a much larger American force until reinforcements arrived.

After the war, in 1783, he returned to Britain and in 1784 was elected to Parliament as the Member for Lanark Burghs, a seat he held until 1790.

In 1787, he was made Major and joined the 60th briefly before returning to the 51st. In 1791 his unit was assigned to the Mediterranean and he was involved in campaigning in the invasion of Corsica and was wounded at Calvi. He was given a Colonelcy and became Adjutant-General to Sir Charles Stuart. Friction between Moore and the new British viceroy of Corsica led to his recall and posting to the West Indies under Sir Ralph Abercromby in 1796. Moore played a leading role in the British recapture of Saint Lucia, which at the time was under the nominal control of the French as a result of a successful invasion by French Republican administrator Victor Hugues. During the campaign, Moore retook Fort Charlotte with the 27th Inniskilling Fusiliers after two days of bitter fighting. The regiment was honoured for their actions in capturing the fort by having their regimental colour displayed on the flagstaff of the captured fortress at Morne Fortune for an hour, before being hauled down and replaced by the British flag. Upon the capture of the fort, Abercromby departed the island, placing Moore in charge of the British garrison.  Moore remained at this post until falling with yellow fever, upon which he was repatriated to Britain.

Moore in Ireland 1798

In 1798, he was made Major-General and served in the suppression of the Irish Rebellion of 1798. His personal intervention was credited with turning the tide at the Battle of Foulksmills on 20 June and he regained control of Wexford town before General Gerard Lake could, thereby possibly preventing its sacking.

Moore and military training
In 1799, he commanded a brigade in the Helder Expedition, with the campaign failing after the British and Russian forces failed to overcome entrenched Dutch defenders. Moore himself was seriously injured in the action. He recovered to lead the 52nd regiment during the British campaign in Egypt against the French, having become colonel of that regiment in 1801 on the death of General Cyrus Trapaud.

He returned to Great Britain in 1803 to command a brigade at Shorncliffe Army Camp near Folkestone, where he established the innovative system of drill and manoeuvre. Sir Arthur Bryant wrote: "Moore's contribution to the British Army was not only that matchless Light Infantry who have ever since enshrined his training, but also the belief that the perfect soldier can only be made by evoking all that is finest in man – physical, mental and spiritual."

War with France 1803–1808
When it became clear that Napoleon was planning an invasion of Britain, Moore was put in charge of the defence of the coast from Dover to Dungeness. It was on his initiative that the Martello Towers were constructed (complementing the already constructed Shorncliffe Redoubt), following a pattern he had been impressed with in Corsica, where the Torra di Mortella, at Mortella Point, had offered a stout resistance to British land and sea forces. He also initiated the cutting of the Royal Military Canal in Kent and Sussex, and recruited about 340,000 volunteers to a militia that would have defended the lines of the South Downs if an invading force had broken through the regular army defences. In 1804, Moore was made a Knight Companion of the Bath and, in 1805, he was promoted to Lieutenant-General.

In 1806, he returned to active duty in the Mediterranean and then in 1808 in the Baltic with Edward Paget to assist the Swedish. Disagreements with Gustavus IV soon led to his being sent home where he was ordered to Portugal in July 1808.

Spanish War 1808–1809

Moore took command of the British forces in the Iberian Peninsula following the recall of Sir Harry Burrard, Sir Hew Dalrymple and Sir Arthur Wellesley (the future Duke of Wellington) to face the inquiry over the Convention of Cintra on the French troops' evacuation from Portugal. When Napoleon arrived in Spain with 200,000 men, Moore drew the French northwards while retreating to his embarkation ports of A Coruña and Vigo. Moore established a defensive position on hills outside the town while being guarded by the 15th Hussars. He was fatally wounded at the Battle of Corunna, being "struck in his left breast and shoulder by a cannon shot, which broke his ribs, his arm, lacerated his shoulder and the whole of his left side and lungs". Like Admiral Lord Nelson, he was mortally wounded in battle, surviving long enough to be assured that he had gained a victory. He remained conscious and composed throughout his final hours. Before succumbing to his wounds, Moore confided to his old friend and aide-de-camp, Colonel Paul Anderson: "You know, I always wished to die this way, I hope the people of England will be satisfied! I hope my country will do me justice!" He asked Colonel Anderson to speak to his friends and mother, but became too emotional to continue, and changed the subject. 

He asked if his staff were safe and was assured that they were, and where his will could be found. Casting his eyes around the room, he spied Charles Banks Stanhope and said to him: "Remember me to your sister, Stanhope." He was then silent and died shortly afterwards.

Moore was buried wrapped in a military cloak in the ramparts of the town. Moore's funeral was commemorated in the poem "The Burial of Sir John Moore after Corunna" by Charles Wolfe (1791–1823), which became popular in 19th-century poetry anthologies. The first verse runs:
Not a drum was heard, not a funeral note,
As his corse to the rampart we hurried;
Not a soldier discharged his farewell shot
O'er the grave where our hero we buried.
ending six verses later with:
Slowly and sadly we laid him down,
From the field of his fame fresh and gory;
We carved not a line, and we raised not a stone,
But we left him alone with his glory.

When the French took the town, a monument was built over his grave by the orders of Marshal Soult. The burial scene was rendered in oil by George Jones, RA, and commissioned by Colonel Anderson. The painting was sold by the family in 2016.

The monument was rebuilt and made more permanent in 1811. In his native Glasgow he is commemorated by a statue in George Square, and in England by a monument in St Paul's Cathedral by John Bacon. Houses are named for him at The High School of Glasgow and HM Queen Victoria School, Dunblane. Sir John Moore Avenue is in Hythe Kent near the Royal Military Canal.

References

Notes

Citations

Sources

Further reading 

  A historical novel depicting the Penobscot Expedition, with a non-fiction "Historical Note" (pp. 451–468) on sources and key details.
 
   Volume I Volume II – The author was a brother of John Moore.
 , volumes I & 2

External links 
 
 Sir John Moore in La Coruña, Spain, A Personal Pilgrimage by Geoff Head & Graciela Albrecht. June 2015.

1761 births
1809 deaths
52nd Regiment of Foot officers
British Army commanders of the Napoleonic Wars
British Army generals
British Army personnel of the American Revolutionary War
British Army personnel of the French Revolutionary Wars
British military personnel killed in action in the Napoleonic Wars
British MPs 1784–1790
Burials in Galicia
Deaths by firearm in Spain
History of A Coruña
Knights Companion of the Order of the Bath
Members of the Parliament of Great Britain for Scottish constituencies
People educated at the High School of Glasgow
Military personnel from Glasgow
People of the Irish Rebellion of 1798
Scottish Freemasons
Scottish soldiers